The Miami Sun Sox (also known as the Miami Tourists) were a minor league baseball affiliate of the Brooklyn Dodgers between 1949 and 1954. They played in the Florida International League and were based in Miami, Florida, at Miami Stadium. The 1952 Sun Sox were recognized as one of the 100 greatest minor league teams of all time.

References

External links
Baseball Reference
Article on 1952 team

Defunct minor league baseball teams
Baseball teams in Miami
Brooklyn Dodgers minor league affiliates
Defunct baseball teams in Florida
1946 establishments in Florida
1954 disestablishments in Florida
Baseball teams established in 1946
Baseball teams disestablished in 1954